Lorković is a Croatian surname. The surname may refer to:

 Blaž Lorković (1839–1892), Croatian economist
 Hrvoje Lorković (1930–2018), Croatian physiologist and writer
 Ivan Lorković (1876–1926), Croatian politician
 Melita Lorković (1907–1987), Croatian pianist
 Mladen Lorković (1909–1944), Croatian politician
 Radoslav Lorković (1958–), Croatian pianist and accordionist
 Zdravko Lorković (1900–1998), Croatian entomologist

Croatian surnames